Longuevillette is a commune in the Somme department in Hauts-de-France in northern France.

Geography
To the north, the soil is mostly clayey, to the south, the soil is mostly silico-limestone. The town is placed on a plateau that separates the courses of the Somme and the Authie. Well water comes from a water table 50 meters deep.

Environmental Policy 
The community rewards the three flowers award to local efforts in favor of the environment.

Population

See also
Communes of the Somme department

References

Communes of Somme (department)